Utetheisa henrii is a moth of the family Erebidae. It is probably endemic to the Galápagos island of San Cristóbal.

The length of the forewings is 14–16 mm for males and 16–17 mm for females.

Larvae probably feed on Tournefortia species.

External links
Two new species of Utetheisa Hübner (Lepidoptera, Noctuidae, Arctiinae) from the Galapagos Islands, Ecuador

henrii
Endemic fauna of the Galápagos Islands
Moths of South America
Moths described in 2009